Boonslick Township is an inactive township in Howard County, in the U.S. state of Missouri.

Boonslick Township was erected in 1821, taking its name from frontiersman Daniel Boone.

References

Townships in Missouri
Townships in Howard County, Missouri